Grodzki, feminine Grodzka is a Polish-language surname. Notable people with this surname include:

Anna Grodzka (born 1954), Polish politician
Tomasz Grodzki (born 1958), Polish politician, doctor and surgeon

See also

Polish-language surnames